The Kashubian Griffin, full name Secret Military Organization "Kashubian Griffin", was a Polish anti-Nazi organization during World War II in Gdańsk Pomerania - Kashubia. It was active between December 1939 and the summer of 1941, when it became part of the more general Pomeranian Griffin.

Literature  
 G. Stone: Slav outposts in Central European history : the Wends, Sorbs and Kashubs, London, UK : Bloomsbury Academic, an imprint of Bloomsbury Publishing Plc, 2016, s. 341

1939 establishments in Poland
1941 disestablishments
History of Pomerania
Polish underground organisations during World War II
Military units and formations of Poland in World War II
Military units and formations established in 1939
Military units and formations disestablished in 1941
Kashubia